Vilayat Inayat Khan (19 June 1916  17 June 2004) was a teacher of meditation and of the traditions of the East Indian Chishti Sufi order of Sufism. His teaching derived from the tradition of his father, Inayat Khan, founder of The Sufi Order in the West (now named the Ināyati Order), in a form tailored to the needs of Western seekers. One of his sisters was Noor Inayat Khan GC MBE. He taught in the tradition of Universal Sufism. His parents met at the New York City ashram of American yogi, Pierre Bernard, half-brother of his mother Pirani Ameena Begum.

In 1975 he founded the Abode of the Message, which serves as the central residential community of the Sufi Order International, a conference and retreat center, and a center of esoteric study.

Death
Vilayat Inayat Khan died on 17 June 2004, two days before his 88th birthday. His son is Zia Inayat Khan.

Bibliography

References

1916 births
2004 deaths
Chishtis
École Normale de Musique de Paris alumni
University of Paris alumni
Alumni of the University of Oxford
Ināyati Sufis
Sufi psychology
People from Suresnes
Indian emigrants to France